Pavel Vladimirovich Palatin (born March 12, 1962) is a Russian professional football coach and a former player. He currently manages the Amateur Football League side FC LuTEK-Energiya Luchegorsk.

External links
 Career summary by KLISF

1962 births
Living people
Soviet footballers
Russian footballers
FC Okean Nakhodka players
Russian football managers
FC Okean Nakhodka managers
Association football midfielders